Jaime Augusto Pizarro Herrera (born 2 March  1964) is a football manager and former football player who played 53 times for the Chile national team between 1987 and 1993. He currently serves as Minister of sports in Gabriel Borics government. He formally served as sub-secretary of the National Institute of Sports of the government of Michelle Bachelet. At club level, he played as a midfielder, principally for the Chilean club Colo-Colo, the team where he was crowned champion both as a player and as a coach.

A teacher of Physical education of profession, he has served director of the same career in the Central University of Chile.

Club career

As a Player

He began his career in Colo-Colo making his professional debut in March 1982 in a friendly game against Olimpia. He played for Colo-Colo until 1993.  For this team he won 6 national championships, 5 Apertura cups and 3 international titles, including the Copa Libertadores de América.

Later on his career he played for Argentinos Juniors and Barcelona Sporting Club, he came back for a brief period to Colo-Colo in 1994 to later play for UANL Tigres where he played for the entire year  1995. Finally he returned to Chile to play for Palestino and Universidad Católica, where he won a seventh league championship in 1997.

As a Coach

He began his career as a coach in Colo-Colo where he won a championship and two runner-up trophies, with the club in bankruptcy.

After he left the "cacique" team, he has coached teams like Audax Italiano and Palestino, achieving with the later one to keep the category of a first division team after a terrible start of the competition in 2006.

As Sub-secretary

On July 30 of 2007 The President of Chile Michelle Bachelet named Jaime Pizarro Sub-secretary of the National Institute of Sports (Chiledeportes), after the resignation of Ricardo Vorpahl.

International career
Pizarro made his debut for the national senior squad on May 6, 1986, against Brazil. He obtained 53 caps, and played the Copa América 1987 final. His last international game was against the national team from Peru at Copa América 1993. His only goal came on June 19, 1989, in a friendly match against Uruguay (2-2) in Montevideo.

Managerial career
He assumed as the coach of Colo-Colo for the 2002 season after being the Sport Manager of Universidad Católica and the assistant coach of Pedro García in the Chile national team. In 2005, he moved to Audax Italiano and, in 2007, he joined Palestino.

Next, he performed as Sport Manager and Director of Colo-Colo (2011–2012) and Santiago Wanderers (2018). In 2021, he returned to coaching and joined Barnechea in the Primera B de Chile until July of the same year.

Personal life
He is the father of the professional footballer Vicente Pizarro.

Honours

Club
Colo-Colo
Primera División de Chile (6): 1983, 1986, 1989, 1990, 1991, 1993
Copa Chile (5): 1982, 1985, 1988, 1989, 1990
Copa Libertadores (1): 1991
Copa Interamericana (1): 1992
Recopa Sudamericana (1): 1992

Universidad Católica
Primera División de Chile (1): 1997 Apertura

Individual
 Best defensive midfielder in the world for the magazine France Football in 1987-1988
 Best Chilean professional footballer for circle of Chilean Sports Journalists in 1991-1992
 Award for outstanding football career by the CONMEBOL 2009

References

External links
 
 Argentine Primera statistics at Fútbol XXI 

1964 births
Living people
Footballers from Santiago
Chilean footballers
Chilean expatriate footballers
Chile international footballers
Colo-Colo footballers
Argentinos Juniors footballers
Barcelona S.C. footballers
Tigres UANL footballers
Club Deportivo Palestino footballers
Club Deportivo Universidad Católica footballers
Chilean Primera División players
Argentine Primera División players
Ecuadorian Serie A players
Liga MX players
1987 Copa América players
1989 Copa América players
1991 Copa América players
1993 Copa América players
Copa Libertadores-winning players
Chilean expatriate sportspeople in Argentina
Chilean expatriate sportspeople in Ecuador
Chilean expatriate sportspeople in Mexico
Expatriate footballers in Argentina
Expatriate footballers in Ecuador
Expatriate footballers in Mexico
Association football midfielders
Chilean football managers
Colo-Colo managers
Audax Italiano managers
Club Deportivo Palestino managers
Chilean Primera División managers
Primera B de Chile managers
Metropolitan University of Educational Sciences alumni
Chilean politicians
Chilean sportsperson-politicians
Politicians from Santiago